Acanthurus nigricauda, the epaulette surgeonfish, black-barred surgeonfish, eye-line surgeonfish, shoulderbar surgeonfish, white-tail surgeonfish or blackstreak surgeonfish, is a tropical fish in the family Acanthuridae. It is native to the Indo-Pacific region.

Description
The profile of the head is convex, the eyes are fairly prominent and there are two pairs of nostrils just in front of the eyes. The dorsal fin has 9 spines and 25 to 28 soft rays, and the anal fin has 3 spines and 23 to 26 soft rays. The caudal fin is crescent-shaped. The body is covered with tiny scales giving it a smooth appearance, and the lateral line is indistinct. The head is usually paler than the body, which is a uniform shade but varies in colour from pale grey to dark brown or nearly black, depending on the fish's mood. There is a bold black streak behind the eye, the "epaulette", which extends as far as the operculum, and a slender black line in front of the pair of sharp "scalpels" on the caudal peduncle. The dorsal fin is yellowish with a black line with blue edge at the margin, and the anal fin is grey with a blue margin. The pectoral fins have an orange base and are banded in grey, yellow and translucent, and the caudal fin has a white base and a dark outer portion bordered with blue. A. nigricauda can be distinguished from the similar doubleband surgeonfish (Acanthurus tennenti) by the single "epaulette" behind its head.

Distribution and habitat
Acanthurus nigricauda occurs in the tropical and subtropical Indian Ocean and the western and central Pacific Ocean. Its range extends from East Africa and Madagascar to the Tuamoto Islands, and from southern Japan to Northern and Eastern Australia and New Caledonia. Unlike most other members of its genus, it is seldom found over coral.

Ecology
Acanthurus nigricauda is a schooling fish and forms shoals, sometimes in association with the orange-band surgeonfish (Acanthurus olivaceus). It feeds by grazing on the algal film that grows over sandy areas in the vicinity of coral or rock substrates, but the proportion of algae in its stomach is low, and it mostly subsists on the organic detritus that gets trapped in the film.

Large aggregations of fish occur at breeding time, with both sexes liberating their gametes into the water column. The scalpels on the caudal peduncle are retractable and are very sharp; they are displayed when the tail is thrust to the side and are used to slash at rival fish and for protection against predators. Juvenile fish are shorter and more deep-bodied than adults.

References

Acanthurus
Fish of the Indian Ocean
Fish of the Pacific Ocean
Fish of Palau
Fish described in 1929
Taxa named by Georg Duncker
Taxa named by Erna Mohr